Varkala Tunnel System, situated in municipality of Varkala of Trivandrum, Kerala, India, also known as the Varkala Canal or  Varkala Thurapp in local dialect. It is one of the historic sites and architectural marvel of the region. This site was constructed by the Travancore Kingdom to establish a continuous inland waterway across Thiruvithamkoor as TS Canal, which was meant to serve as a trade route. The construction of the two long tunnels was started in 1867 and the first was completed in 1877 while the second was completed in 1880.

The tunnel is located under the main cliff of the region and represents the architectural excellence of the workers and engineers of that era.

Built under the supervision of T. Madhava Rao, the Dewan of Travancore Kingdom, the tunnel also make up for the Varkala reach of Thiruvananthapuram–Shoranur canal, which passes through this delicate structure.

Features 
The tunnel is built in an area that is famous for Cenozoic sedimentary formation cliffs are a unique geological feature on the otherwise flat Kerala coast, and are known among geologists as Varkala Formation. The tunnels are carved through Laterite rocks.

There are two tunnels in the system namely,

 Sivagiri Passage 722 m long and,
 Chilakkoor Passage 350 m long.

The tunnel system connects the Anchuthengu Kayal with Edava- Nadayara Kayal.

Present Status 
Despite immense tourism potential the passages remain unused. It is silted and maintenance works are all in limbo. In 2006 period there was a renewed interest to revive the tunnels by then Chief minister of Kerala, Shri. V. S. Achuthanandan he had even undertaken a boat ride in the canal to make a first-hand assessment.
Thereafter it was in limbo until 2014 -16 period, when  few discussions started again and died down as usual. In 2016, the state government had sought the help of Metroman E. Sreedharan to revive the tunnel.

In 2017 there were discussions to construct new waterway bypass skipping existing tunnels due to lack of width and draft as per National Waterways standards.

As of 2020, in Chilakkoor passage, dredging work and sledge removal are progressing. Works on Sivagiri passage is also expected to start soon. The passages are planned to be used for tourist activities.

Also Government of India has turned down Kerala's demand to extend the existing National Waterway 3 route to Kovalam from Kollam through Varkala.

See also 

 Waterways transport in Kerala
 TS Canal
 AVM Canal
 Kollam Canal

References

Tunnels completed in 1877
Tunnels in India
Transport in Thiruvananthapuram
Tourist attractions in Thiruvananthapuram
Buildings and structures in Thiruvananthapuram
Water tunnels in India
1877 establishments in India